The Mitsubishi MH 2000 is a 7/12 seat light utility helicopter. Low levels of interest in the aircraft forced Mitsubishi to halt sales of MH2000 in September 2004.

Design and development

The MH2000 is Japan's first indigenous helicopter with Mitsubishi Heavy Industries (MHI) having sole responsibility for developing and manufacturing the fuselage and engines.

In the development of the MH2000, MHI aimed for safety, economy and low noise levels. The program was launched in 1995 to fulfill a variety of missions, include passenger and business transport, law enforcement, search and rescue and emergency medical services.

The first of four developmental aircraft first flew on 29 July 1996, the second flying later that year and the remaining two used for ground testing. The MH2000 has its engine module and dynamic system positioned behind the cabin section to minimize sound levels in the passenger compartment. Power is provided by a pair of Mitsubishi MG5-100 turboshaft engines.

The first production model was delivered on October 1, 2000, to Excel air service in Japan. The loss of one prototype due to tail rotor blade separation led to suspension of type certificate and redesign of tail rotor. Delivered craft were modified with the new rotor and all further craft will be delivered with the new tail rotor.

Specifications

References

World aircraft information files brightstar publishing London sheet 34 file 901

External links

 Mitsubishi Heavy Industries Technical Review "Development of Commercial Helicopter MH 2000" (Japanese)
 Mitsubishi Heavy Industries Technical Review "Application of MH2000 Commercial Helicopter"
 Development of Mitsubishi MH2000 Helicopter – ERF Document Repository
 FLUG REVUE Datafiles: Mitsubishi MH2000

1990s Japanese helicopters
1990s Japanese civil utility aircraft
MH2000
Aircraft first flown in 1996